Floyd Freeman Graham (aka  'Fessor) (October 15, 1902 – August 18, 1974 in Denton, Texas) was a US collegiate bandleader and music educator who founded and directed the Aces of Collegeland in 1927, the university dance band, pit orchestra and stage band of the University of North Texas College of Music.  He also was a violinist.  The Aces of Collegeland was the forerunner to the One O'Clock Lab Band.  Graham laid the groundwork at North Texas for what became the first college degree in jazz studies.

Many of the Ace's band members and Saturday night participants became a "who's who" in the performing arts – as members of famous big bands, film, and singers.

Notable Saturday Night Performers with the Aces

 Ann Sheridan
 Joan Blondell
 Louise Tobin
 Nancy Jane Gates
 Linda Darnell
 Pat Boone

Notable "Aces" Alumni

 Harry Babasin
 Bob Dorough
 Herb Ellis
 Jimmy Giuffre
 Charles W. LaRue
 William F. Lee III
 William Ennis Thomson
 JB Floyd

In 1971, the University of North Texas Student Government Association designated him as "Honor Professor," and upon retirement May 31, 1973, the regents awarded him the lifetime status of professor emeritus.  He was the university's first professor emeritus.

Education
Graham earned a Bachelor of Arts from the University of North Texas.

Graham earned a Teachers Certificate from Chicago Musical College in 1927 and a Bachelor of Music degree in violin from Chicago Musical College in August 1931.  While attending Chicago Musical College, Graham studied violin with Max Ignatz Fischel (1878–1937) (Head of the Normal Department), ear training with Harold Burnham Maryott (born 1878), music history with Herbert Witherspoon (1873–1935); harmony and counterpoint with Hans Franklin Madsen (1887–1971), and composition, counterpoint, and solfeggio with Wesley LaViolette (1894–1978).

Graham also earned a Master of Music degree from the American Conservatory of Music.

At the American Conservatory of Music, Graham had been a pupil of:

 Herbert Dalton Butler (1867–1946) – violin
 Leo Sowerby (1895–1968) – composition & counterpoint

In Texas, Graham had been a pupil of:
 Carl Venth (1860–1938)

He also had been a pupil of:

 Fritz Mahler
 Ferde Grofé (1892–1972)

Family and growing up 
Floyd Graham was the son of Schyler Colfax Graham (1869–1931), a Denton grocer, and Rockie Virginia Graham  (1879–1954) Freeman.  Floyd Graham first exhibited his interest in music by experimenting with a cigar-box violin while in grade school.
 

Floyd Graham married Doris Patricia Howard on September 2, 1942.  They had a daughter, Patricia (Pati) (Graham) Haworth.

'Fessor Graham Award for Faculty
In 1958, the North Texas student body established the 'Fessor Graham Award, the highest honor bestowed by the students to a faculty member. The award recognizes one faculty member each year for outstanding and unselfish service beyond the call of duty to students.

 Floyd Graham, Music, 1958
 Beulah Harriss, PE & Intercollegiate Women's Athletics, 1959
 Samuel B. McAlister, Government, 1960
 Arthur M. Sampley, Library Service, 1961
 William B. DeMougeot, Speech & Debate, 1962
 A. Witt Blair, Education, 1963
 Chester A. Newland, Government, 1964
 Leon Breeden, Music, 1965
 William R. Garner, Government, 1966
 Clovis Morrisson, Political Science, 1967
 Kendall Pinney Cochran (1924–2007), Economics, 1968
 Don E. Beck, Speech and Drama, 1969
Student government in transition, no recipients, 1970-71
 James Riddlesperger, Political Science, 1972
 Charles Foster, Business, 1973
 Leo Estrada, Sociology, 1974
 Ben Chappell, Speech Communications, 1975
 Milan J. Reban, Political Science, 1976
 T. Bullock Hyder, Economics, 1977
 Anshel Brusilow, Music, 1978
 Umesh C. Banerjee, Biology, 1979
 Tommie Collins Lawhon, Education, 1980
 Douglas P. Starr, Journalism, 1981
 David R. Fitch, Business, 1982
 Jerry Lee Yeric, Political Science, 1983
 John James Haynie, Music, 1984
 Lee Knox, Geography, 1985
 J. B. Spalding, Business, 1986
 John S. Gossett, Communication and Public Address, 1987
 Richard H. Wells, Journalism, 1988
 Ernest F. Crystle, Foreign Languages and Literatures, 1989
 Dan Haerle, Music, 1990
 Valerie D. Martinez, Political Science, 1991
 Fred Hamilton, Music, 1992
 Kenneth Godwin, Political Science, 1993
 Robert S. LaForte, History, 1994
 Norris D. Fox, Education, 1995
 Ann S. Windle, Education, 1996
 Donald E. Chipman, History, 1997
 P.R. Chandrasekaran, Finance, Insurance, Real Estate and Law, 1998
 Juliet Getty, Merchandising and Hospitality Management, 1999
 William T. Waller, Biological Sciences, 2000
 Gladys H. Crawford, Biological Sciences, 2001
 Thomas P. Sovik, Music, 2002
 Richard Tas, Merchandising and Hospitality Management, 2003
 Brian L. Bowman, Music, 2004
 David W. Hill, Kinesiology, Health Promotion and Recreation, 2005
 Kimi King, Political Science, 2006
 Dee C. Ray, Counseling and Higher Education, 2007
 Donna Ledgerwood, Human Resources Management, 2008
 Lyndal M. Bullock, Education, 2009
 Gloria Cox, Political Science & Dean of the Honors College, 2010
 Armin R. Mikler, Computer Science and Engineering, 2011
 Shahla Ala'i-Rosales, Behavior Analysis, 2012
 Andrew Enterline, Political Science, 2013
 Brian Lain, Communications Studies, 2014
 Bethany Blackstone, Political Science, 2015
 Michael Thompson, Philosophy and Religion, 2016

Floyd Graham Memorial Scholarship
The College of Music offers a scholarship as a memorial to Floyd Graham, sponsored by the Floyd Graham Society.

Recipients

 2007 — Sam Reid, Saxophone

North Texas Jazz Festival's Floyd 'Fessor Graham Award
The North Texas Jazz Festival established the Floyd 'Fessor Graham Award for the outstanding high school or middle school vocal group.  The winner performs during one of the evening's "pro" concerts.

Publications

 Floyd Freeman Graham, Public relations in music education, a study, Exposition Press, New York (1954)
 Floyd Freeman Graham, For Music Literature, (Unknown Binding) (1965)
 Floyd Freeman Graham, For music appreciation; a course outline to supplement the teaching of music appreciation, Denton, Tex., Howard Pub. Co., Denton, TX (1960)

Notes and references

American music educators
1902 births
1974 deaths
American Conservatory of Music alumni
Chicago Musical College alumni
University of North Texas College of Music faculty
American jazz educators
20th-century American musicians